Poppamies (Finnish for "medicine man") is a Finnish food company specialising in hot chili pepper products.

History
Poppamies was founded in 2008 by Marko Suksi, who was working at Nokia at the time and founded the company as a side business because of his love for food and spices. In 2009, Suksi quit his job at Nokia to concentrate fully on his own company Poppamies. Currently the company has a revenue of several million euro.

Awards

The company won the international Flavor Awards competition in the United States with its Cherry & Cola BBQ sauce in 2018.

References

External links
 Official site

Food and drink companies of Finland